Inn signs have a history that extends beyond the Middle Ages, when many houses were identified by a sign, often a heraldic charge, which signified that the premises were under the special care of a nobleman, or a vivid image that impressed itself on the memory. The ruins of Herculaneum and Pompeii reveal that most of their street-front shops displayed an identifying sign outside. 

In Ireland and the United Kingdom especially, the tradition, by which publicans were obliged to identify their premises by a sign, dating from the reign of Richard II, is carried on today. A selection of inn signs carved on slabs and rescued after the Great Fire of London is preserved in the Guildhall.

External links 
http://www.breweryartists.co.uk/ History of a now defunct studio and examples of painted signs

Notes 

Signage
Pubs